With the Wild Crowd! Live in Athens, GA is the first official live album and DVD release by American new wave band The B-52s. The concert was recorded on February 18, 2011 at The Classic Center in the band's hometown of Athens, Georgia, commemorating the 34th anniversary of their first performance as a group on February 14, 1977.

The audio recording was released on October 10, 2011 on CD and iTunes by Eagle Records, while a DVD and Blu-ray release followed on March 20, 2012 by Eagle Records' parent company, Eagle Rock Entertainment.

Track listing

Personnel
The B-52's
Fred Schneider – vocals
Kate Pierson – vocals
Cindy Wilson – vocals
Keith Strickland – guitar
Tracy Wormworth – bass
Sterling Campbell – drums
Paul Gordon – keyboards, guitar

References

The B-52's video albums
2011 live albums
2012 video albums
Live video albums
Eagle Rock Entertainment live albums
Eagle Rock Entertainment video albums
The B-52's live albums
Eagle Records live albums